Abdul Karim ( – 24 July 2007) was a Bangladeshi historian. He served as the 5th Vice-Chancellor of the University of Chittagong. He was awarded Ekushey Padak in 1995 by the Government of Bangladesh.

Early life 
Karim was born on 1 June 1928. In 1944 he completed his High Madrasa Examination and in 1946 his Intermediate Arts Examination. He completed his BA from University of Dhaka in 1949 and his masters in 1950.

Career
Karim joined the University of Dhaka as a lecturer in 1951. He was mentored by Ahmad Hasan Dani. He later went to the UK to earn his Ph.D and finished it in 1958. His desertion topic was Social History of the Muslims in Bengal. He completed a second PhD from the School of Oriental and African Studies, University of London. In 1966, he joined Chittagong University as Chairman of the Department of History. He retired from the University in 1986. He joined the Institute for Bangladesh Studies of the University of Rajshahi as a senior fellow and in 2001 was made professor emeritus.

Selected bibliography 
 Corpus of the Muslim Coins of Bengal 
 Corpus of the Arabic and Persian Inscriptions of Bengal
 History of Bengal, Mughal Period
 Murshid Quli Khan and His Times
 Dhaka, the Mughal Capital
 The Rohingyas: A Short Account of their History and Culture
 Banglar Itihas
Social History of the Muslims in Bengal (Down to A.D. 1538)

Death 
Karim died on 24 July 2007 in Chittagong, Bangladesh.

References

20th-century Bangladeshi historians
Academic staff of the University of Dhaka
Vice-Chancellors of the University of Chittagong
Recipients of the Ekushey Padak
Date of birth missing
Place of birth missing
Academic staff of the University of Chittagong
Alumni of the University of London
Academic staff of the University of Rajshahi
2007 deaths
People from Banshkhali Upazila